The 2019–20 season will be Tatabánya KC's 48th competitive and consecutive season in the Nemzeti Bajnokság I and 77th year in existence as a handball club.

Players

Squad information

Goalkeepers
1  Xavér Deményi
 16  László Bartucz
 21  Ádám Borbély
Left Wingers
6  Miloš Vujović
 40  Bence Ernei
Right Wingers
4  Ákos Pásztor
 47  Péter Hornyák
Line players
8  Adrián Sipos
 20  András Szász
 24  János Dénes (c)
 77  Vladimir Vranjes

Left Backs
9  Bence Bálint
 18  Ferenc Ilyés
 34  Vitaly Komogorov
Central Backs
7  Ádám Juhász
 13  Uroš Borzaš
 22  Mátyás Győri
Right Backs
 19  Zsolt Balogh
 27  Gábor Ancsin

Transfers
Source:  hetmeteres.hu

 In:
 Gábor Ancsin (loan from Veszprém)
 Zsolt Balogh (from Szeged)
 Ádám Borbély (from  Wisła Płock)
 Bence Ernei (from Veszprém U23)
 Péter Hornyák (from Balatonfüred)
 Vitaly Komogorov (from  Dinamo București)
 András Szász (from  Dinamo București)

 Out:
 Dániel Fekete  (to ETO-SZESE)
  Demis Grigoraș (to  Chambéry)
 Kristóf Győri  (loan to Ferencváros)
 Bence Nagy  (to Ferencváros)
 Miklós Rosta (to Szeged)
 Kevin Rozner  (to Vác)
 Zsolt Schäffer  (to Ferencváros)
 Márton Székely (to Veszprém)
  Jakov Vranković (to  Dinamo București)

Club

Technical Staff

Source: Coaches, Staff

Uniform
Supplier: Jako
Main sponsor: tippmix / Tatabánya Erőmű Kft / City of Tatabánya
Back sponsor: Grundfos
Shorts sponsor: Bridgestone / rb

Competitions

Overview

Nemzeti Bajnokság I

Results by round

Matches

Results overview

Hungarian Cup

Matches

EHF Cup

Third qualifying round

Grundfos Tatabanya KC won, 53–51 on aggregate.

Group stage

Matches

Results overview

Statistics

Top scorers
Includes all competitive matches. The list is sorted by shirt number when total goals are equal.
Last updated on 31 January 2020

Attendances

List of the home matches:

References

Notes

External links
 
 Grundfos Tatabánya KC at eurohandball.com

 
Tatabánya KC